Rudolf Mayr (born 16 January 1949 in Thalgau) is a sailor from Austria, who represented his country at the 1976 Summer Olympics in Kingston, Ontario, Canada as crew member in the Soling. With helmsman Hubert Raudaschl and fellow crew member Walter Raudaschl they took the 17th place.

Sources
 

Living people
1949 births
Sailors at the 1976 Summer Olympics – Soling
Olympic sailors of Austria
People from Salzburg-Umgebung District
Sportspeople from Salzburg (state)
Austrian male sailors (sport)